Yakir Aharonov (born August 28, 1932) is an Israeli physicist specializing in quantum physics. He has been a Professor of Theoretical Physics and the James J. Farley Professor of Natural Philosophy at Chapman University in California since 2008. He is also a distinguished professor in the Perimeter Institute and a professor emeritus at Tel Aviv University in Israel. He is president of the IYAR, The Israeli Institute for Advanced Research.

Biography
Yakir Aharonov was born in Haifa. He received his undergraduate education at the Technion – Israel Institute of Technology in Haifa, graduating with a BSc in 1956. He continued his graduate studies at the Technion and then moved to Bristol University, UK together with his doctoral advisor David Bohm, receiving a Ph.D. degree in 1960. Aharonov later taught at the Brandeis University from 1960–61 and the Yeshiva University from 1964–67, both in the United States.

Academic career
His research interests are nonlocal and topological effects in quantum mechanics, quantum field theories and interpretations of quantum mechanics. In 1959, he and David Bohm proposed the Aharonov–Bohm effect for which he co-received the 1998 Wolf Prize.

In 1988, Aharonov et al. published their theory of weak values. This work was motivated by Aharonov's long-time quest to experimentally verify his theory that apparently random events in quantum mechanics are caused by events in the future (two-state vector formalism). Verifying a present effect of a future cause requires a measurement, which would ordinarily destroy coherence and ruin the experiment. He and his colleagues claim that they were able to use weak measurements and verify the present effect of the future cause. Working with Aharon Casher, they predicted the Aharonov–Casher effect, the electrodynamic dual of the Aharonov–Bohm effect with magnetic dipoles and charges.

Timeline
1960–1961: Research Associate, Brandeis University
1961–1964: Assistant Professor, Yeshiva University
1964–1967: Associate Professor, Yeshiva University
1967–1973: Joint professorship at Tel Aviv University and  Yeshiva University
1973–2006: Joint professorship at Tel Aviv University and the University of South Carolina
2006–2008: Professor at George Mason University
2008–present: Professor of Theoretical Physics and the James J. Farley Professor of Natural Philosophy at Chapman University

Awards and recognition
1978: Elected Fellow of the American Physical Society
1984: Weizmann Prize in Physics
1984: Rothschild Prize in Physics
1989: Israel Prize in exact science
1990: Elected to the Israel Academy of Sciences and Humanities
1991: The Elliott Cresson Medal – The Franklin Institute
1992: Honorary Doctor of Science, Technion – Israel Institute of Technology
1993: Elected Member of the National Academy of Sciences, USA
1993: Honorary Doctor of Science, University of South Carolina, USA
1995: Hewlett–Packard Europhysics Prize
1997: Honorary Doctor of Science, Bristol University, UK
1998: Wolf Prize in Physics
1999: Honorary Doctor of Science, University of Buenos Aires, Argentina
2006: EMET Prize in Exact Science
In 2009, the information service Thomson Reuters named Aharonov as leading candidate for the 2009 Nobel prize in physics, based on his work's influence on quantum physics.
2010: National Medal of Science (2009), awarded and presented by President Barack Obama

See also
List of Israel Prize recipients

References

External links
Aharonov homepage at Chapman University
Aharonov biography
Aharonov homepage at USC
Aharonov homepage at Tel Aviv University

1932 births
Living people
Jews in Mandatory Palestine
Israeli Jews
20th-century Israeli physicists
Israel Prize in exact science recipients
Israel Prize in exact science recipients who were physicists
Jewish scientists
Academic staff of Tel Aviv University
Wolf Prize in Physics laureates
Fellows of the American Physical Society
Members of the European Academy of Sciences and Arts
Scientists from Haifa
Chapman University faculty
Members of the Israel Academy of Sciences and Humanities
Members of the United States National Academy of Sciences
Alumni of the University of Bristol
Jewish physicists